Gruzdžiai  is a small town in Šiauliai County in northern-central Lithuania. In 2011 it had a population of 1,467.

The town has a post office (ZIP code: 81024) and a gymnasium. Gruzdžiai was the birthplace of Lithuanian exile novelist Marius Katiliškis.

References

This article was initially translated from the Lithuanian Wikipedia.

Towns in Lithuania
Towns in Šiauliai County
Shavelsky Uyezd